Shanna Helen Swan is an American environmental and reproductive epidemiologist who is Professor of Environmental Medicine and Public Health at the Icahn School of Medicine at Mount Sinai, where she has taught since April 2011. She is known for her research on environmental contributions to sperm count and the male infertility crisis, and a paper she co-authored on the subject in 2017 received significant attention in both the popular media and scholarly literature, becoming the world's 26th most referenced scientific paper published that year. She has also researched the effects of environmental chemicals and pharmaceutical drugs on the development of the human reproductive tract. In 2021, with journalist Stacey Colino, Swan co-authored the book Count Down: How Our Modern World Is Altering Male and Female Reproductive Development, Threatening Sperm Counts, and Imperiling the Future of the Human Race, which discusses declining sperm counts in men and attributes this decline to endocrine-disrupting chemicals.

She was the first wife of David A. Freedman, with whom she had two children: Joshua Freedman and Deborah Freedman Lustig.

References

External links

Living people
American epidemiologists
American women epidemiologists
21st-century American women scientists
20th-century American women scientists
University of Rochester faculty
Icahn School of Medicine at Mount Sinai faculty
City College of New York alumni
Columbia University alumni
University of California, Berkeley alumni
Year of birth missing (living people)